The Lansdowne Club is a private members' club in London, England occupying a large building, notable in its own right. It was established in 1935 and occupies most of 9 Fitzmaurice Place, a street connecting Berkeley Square to Curzon Street in Mayfair.

History

The club formed later than many London clubs, and it permitted women from its inception. It has always had a relatively young membership, with an active social scene. The building's main Adam and otherwise 1930s Art Deco interiors, with some authentic frontages, mean it has been Grade II* listed since its first assessment in 1970. This is the mid-category of listed building, a statutory scheme of protection which has a pyramidal hierarchy.

In 1930, Westminster City Council decided to improve access to Berkeley Square by creating an extra road into the square. This was accomplished by demolishing half of the main range of Lansdowne House, which stood since the 1760s. What remained was given a new frontage and a newly renovated interior, and became the Lansdowne Club. The 'First Drawing Room' was thus taken to the Philadelphia Museum of Art, and the 'Dining Room' exists in the Metropolitan Museum of Art in New York City.

The venue was founded as a 'social, residential and athletic Club for members of social standing' and their families, and unlike many rivals, it had no vocational, artistic, or political 'theme'. Its facilities include a ballroom, a terrace, a fencing Salle and a basement gym with Art Deco swimming pool. Internally architecture is extremely unusual; some is modern for its type, being significantly Art Deco, as opposed to Georgian/Victorian/Edwardian styles. The Adam Room and other parts of the club on the ground floor are Georgian though.

The building underwent extensive renovation and further modernisation in 2000. Resident fencing coach,  Wojciechowski, is official coach of the British Olympic squad.

Members past and present

Richard Dimbleby 
Beryl Cook
John Bly
Luke Fildes (fencer)
Ian Campbell-Gray
Loyd Grossman
James Mason
Charles Arnold-Baker
Terry Beddard
Mary Glen-Haig
Desmond Flower, 10th Viscount Ashbrook
Archibald Craig
Frederick Ramon de Bertodano y Wilson, 8th Marquis del Moral
Bill Hoskyns
Baroness Butler-Sloss
Peter Alliss
John Emrys Lloyd
Nick Halsted
Paul Smith (fashion designer)
 Ermine, Lady Elibank (née Aspinwall widow of Gideon Oliphant-Murray, 2nd Viscount Elibank)
Elizabeth Blackadder
Merlin Hanbury-Tracy, 7th Baron Sudeley
Joachim von Ribbentrop (before the outbreak of World War II)
Tim Richardson (writer)
Rainier III, Prince of Monaco and Grace Kelly were honorary members

Chairmen

1935–40 Dr. F. Howard Humphies
1940–54 Sir Frederick Arnold-Baker
1954–57 Clarence Napier Bruce, 3rd Baron Aberdare
1957 (interim) Morys Bruce, 4th Baron Aberdare
1957–63 P.D. Krolik esq
1963–67 Major J. Fletcher
1967–88 C.G. Findlay esq
1988–97 J.R.M. Keatley esq
1998–2006 J Moore 
2006–10 D. Whitehouse esq
2010–14 C. Powell esq
2014–15 Dr D Prince
2015–18 D. Whitehouse esq
2018–19 J. North esq
2019–20 M. Dixon esq
2020–   K. Hollender esq

See also
List of London's gentlemen's clubs

Further reading

References

External links

1935 establishments in England
Art Deco architecture in London
Gentlemen's clubs in London
Grade II* listed buildings in the City of Westminster
Grade II* listed houses
Mayfair